Thanabalan a/l Nadarajah (born 25 February 1995) is a Malaysian professional footballer who plays as forward for Malaysia Super League side Sabah.

Career
As a child Thanabalan regularly played football at school field of Sekolah Jenis Kebangsaan Tamil, Sungai Gadut, Seremban while trained by his own father. He later furthered his education at Tunku Ismail Sports School in Johor.

In 2013, Thanabalan signed five-year contract with Negeri Sembilan. He was listed to the senior team in 2013 season and was given the number 28 jersey. He made his debut in a 2-0 home defeat against Pahang on 22 May 2013, coming in as substitutes in the 68 minutes replacing Nazrin Nawi. He also featured for the Negeri Sembilan U-21 in the Malaysia President's Cup.

In 2014 Thanabalan made his first ever league start for Negeri Sembilan against DRB-Hicom on 24 January 2014. He played for 68 minutes before being replaced by Fauzi Nan.

During 2015 season, Thanabalan was allocated the number 33 shirt. Thanabalan made his first appearance of the 2015 season  as a substitute in Negeri Sembilan's opening Liga Premier match, a 1–1 draw at home against Kuantan. He made 14 appearances and scored 3 goals.

Thanabalan was loan to FELCRA in 2017. He made his debut against Penjara FC in the 2017 Malaysia FA Cup. He made 13 appearances and scored 5 goals. He return to Negeri Sembilan in 2018 and made 12 appearances scoring 3 goals.

In 2019, he transferred to Kedah. He made his debut in a 1-1 draw against Perak on 8 February 2019. He also won the 2019 Malaysia FA Cup and made 3 appearances in the competition.

In 2020 season, Thanabalan was loan to Perak II. He made his debut in a 2-2 draw against Sarawak United on 29 August 2020.

After his contract ended with Kedah, Thanabalan join Borneo based club Sabah and made a reunion with former Malaysia youth coach, Ong Kim Swee. He made 10 appearances in all competition for Sabah in 2021.

International career
Thanabalan was capped at youth level with Malaysia. He made 6 appearances and 4 goals in 2017 Southeast Asian Games. He also played in the final against Thailand which Malaysia lost 0–1 due to an own goal scored by Malaysian keeper Haziq Nadzli.
Thanabalan was part of the national team that qualified for the 2018 AFC U-23 Championship that took place in China and he scored 2 goals in 3 appearances during the qualification matches.

Personal life
Originated from Kampung Sagga, Rantau in the state of Negeri Sembilan, Thanabalan the oldest child of S. Nadarajah, who is paralysed from the chest down following a road accident in 2013 and V. Thirusundari who is a housewife. He has a younger brother and a younger sister, Keeteswaran and Keerthikaa. Thanabalan has a girlfriend who is studying law at a local college.

Career statistics

Club

International goals

Malaysia Under-23

Honours

Club
Kedah 
 Malaysia FA Cup: 2019
 Malaysia Cup: Runner-up 2019

International
Malaysia U-23
Southeast Asian Games
 Silver Medal: 2017

References

External links
 

1995 births
Living people
Malaysian footballers
Malaysian people of Tamil descent
Malaysian sportspeople of Indian descent
Negeri Sembilan FA players
Felcra FC players
Sabah F.C. (Malaysia) players
People from Negeri Sembilan
Association football forwards
Southeast Asian Games silver medalists for Malaysia
Southeast Asian Games medalists in football
Competitors at the 2017 Southeast Asian Games